Richard Edward Floyd (February 3, 1931 – August 11, 2011) was a California State Assemblyman from the 53rd District who served from 1980 until 1992, when he was defeated by Juanita Millender-McDonald, after he and fellow Democratic assemblyman Dave Elder were reapportioned into the 55th District. He represented the 55th District again after McDonald was elected to Congress from 1996 until 2000, when he was termed out. He ran for a neighboring State Senate seat in 2000, but lost in the primary to Edward Vincent. Floyd received approximately 30% of the vote.

On the March 10, 1989, edition of ABC News Nightline, Floyd debated Lou Albano on state athletic commissions deregulating professional wrestling following Vince McMahon's public acknowledgment of its predetermined nature. Floyd had recently introduced a bill supporting deregulation by the California State Athletic Commission, and claimed it was foolish for states to be involved in assigning referees whose roles require they act incompetently. Albano aggressively promoted the American Wrestling Association and National Wrestling Alliance as more legitimate than McMahon's World Wrestling Federation (which he had recently and unamicably left), and deserving the same safety regulations afforded other sports. Floyd laughed off Albano's insistence on maintaining kayfabe, saying of it, "He's playing a game, like they all do. I'm a politician, I do the same thing."

References

External links
 Richard Floyd

1931 births
2011 deaths
Politicians from Philadelphia
Democratic Party members of the California State Assembly
People from Los Angeles County, California
20th-century American politicians